The Hillsboro Free Press is a local weekly newspaper from Hillsboro, Kansas.  The paper publishes every Wednesday.  It is one of two newspapers in the city, the other being the Hillsboro Star-Journal.

See also

The other newspapers in Marion County are Hillsboro Star-Journal, Marion County Record, Peabody Gazette-Bulletin.

References

External links
 
 1916 History of Early Marion County Newspapers

Weekly newspapers published in the United States
Newspapers published in Kansas
Marion County, Kansas